Naputnovo is a rural locality (a village) in Pekshinskoye Rural Settlement, Petushinsky District, Vladimir Oblast, Russia. The population was 26 as of 2010. There are 7 streets.

Geography 
Naputnovo is located on the Peksha River, 25 km east of Petushki (the district's administrative centre) by road. Abbakumovo is the nearest rural locality.

References 

Rural localities in Petushinsky District